CFMQ-FM is a Canadian radio station that broadcasts a community radio format at 98.1 FM in Hudson Bay, Saskatchewan. CFMQ is owned by HB Communications Inc.

The station received approval on August 15, 1994 and began broadcasting in October the same year.

References

External links
CFMQ (Town of Hudson Bay)
 

FMQ
FMQ
Radio stations established in 1994
1994 establishments in Saskatchewan